Thomas Thomson (4 December 1817 – 18 April 1878) was a British surgeon with the British East India Company before becoming a botanist. He was a friend of Joseph Dalton Hooker and helped write the first volume of Flora Indica. 

He was born in Glasgow the son of Thomas Thomson, chemistry professor at Glasgow University. He qualified as an M.D. at Glasgow University in 1839, as was appointed Assistant Surgeon in the Bengal Army 21 December 1839. 

He served during the campaign in Afghanistan 1839-1842 being present at the capture of Ghazni in 1839 and was taken prisoner at Ghazni in March 1842 but was released 21 September 1842. He served in the Sutlej campaign, 1845–46, being present at Firuzshahr, and in the second Sikh war, 1848–49. 

During 1847–48, Thomson served on the Kashmir Boundary Commission under the leadership of Alexander Cunningham. (Henry Strachey was the other commissioner.) Thomson explored the northern frontier of Kashmir, along the Karakoram Range.

He was promoted Surgeon on 1 December 1853 and Surgeon Major on 21 December 1859.

He became Superintendent of the Honourable East India Company's Botanic Garden at Calcutta and was the Naturalist to and Member of the Tibet Mission. He was appointed a Fellow of the Royal Society in 1855 and retired 25 September 1863. In 1866 he was awarded the Royal Geographical Society's Founder's Medal.

He died in London, England, on 18 April 1878.

References

External links

www.unb.ca/herbarium/notes.html

Scottish botanists
Scottish naturalists
Scottish surgeons
1817 births
1878 deaths
British people in colonial India
British East India Company civil servants
Indian Medical Service officers
Scottish expatriates in India
Fellows of the Royal Society
Alumni of the University of Glasgow
Military personnel from Glasgow
19th-century British botanists
19th-century Scottish people
Medical doctors from Glasgow
British military personnel of the First Anglo-Afghan War
British military personnel of the First Anglo-Sikh War
British military personnel of the Second Anglo-Sikh War